Arachne is a stable Internet suite containing a graphical web browser, email client, and dialer. Originally, Arachne was developed by Michal Polák under his xChaos label, a name he later changed into Arachne Labs. It was written in C and compiled using Borland C++ 3.1. Arachne has since been released under the GPL as Arachne GPL.

Arachne primarily runs on DOS-based operating systems, but includes builds for Linux as well. The Linux version relies on SVGALib and therefore does not require a display server.

Background

Arachne supports many file formats, protocols and standards including video modes from CGA 640×200 in monochrome to VESA 1024×768 in high color mode ( colors). It is designed for systems that do not have any windowing system installed.

Arachne supports multiple image formats including JPEG, PNG, BMP and animated GIF. It supports a subset of the HTML 4.0 and CSS 1.0 standards, including full support for tables and frames. Supported protocols include FTP, NNTP for USENET forums, POP3, SMTP and Gopher. Arachne includes a full-fledged TCP/IP connection suite, which has support for some dial-up and Ethernet connections. However, Arachne has no support for JavaScript, Java or SSL. Arachne can be expanded with the use of add-ons for such tasks as watching DivX movies, playing MP3 files, IRC chat, RSS and viewing PDF documents. Arachne also supports DOS Gateway Interface (DGI), a unique feature similar to Common Gateway Interface (CGI) scripting on the client.

The first version of Arachne with a known release date was 1.0 Beta 2, which was released on 22 December 1996. The final and official version by Arachne Labs was 1.70R3 for DOS (released 22 January 2001) and 1.66 beta for Linux (released 20 July 2000). While there have been several more DOS versions, Linux development lay dormant until 24 May 2008 when a beta version 1.93 for Linux was released. The current DOS version, maintained by Glenn McCorkle, is 1.99 as of 23 December 2021. In 2006, there also was an experimental DPMI port of Arachne by Udo Kuhnt, named DPMI Arachne.

Support
Arachne supports a limited subset of stylesheets and HTML. Known support as of version 1.93:

Derivatives 

xChaos software licensed the source code of Arachne to Caldera UK in 1997. Caldera UK added Novell's dialer and TCP/IP stack, JavaScript, SSL, implemented their own support for frames, added support for animated GIFs, audio output, printing on a multitude of printers, an optional on-screen keyboard for mouse and touch panel usage (SoftKeyboards), user profiles, and they completely changed the design of the browser (customizable), using Allegro for graphics. Also, they ported it to compile as a 32-bit protected mode extended DOS application (utilizing DPMI using DJGPP, a GNU compiler for DOS), while Arachne is a 16-bit application. This program was sold as DR-WebSpyder in 1998; the name was to associate it with DR-DOS, which Caldera owned at the time.

When Caldera had transferred DR-DOS to its branch company Caldera Thin Clients, which renamed itself into Lineo in 1999, the browser was referred to under the name Embrowser. Since 2000, the Linux port of the browser has been called Embedix Browser.

See also 
 Comparison of web browsers
 Lynx (text-based)
 FreeDOS
 List of web browsers
 MINUET (graphical)
 List of Usenet newsreaders
 Comparison of Usenet newsreaders

References

Further reading

External links 

 Arachne Development group & list
 Arachne GPL
 Arachne Add-ons
 Arachne Labs homepage
 Mel's Arachne4DOS UK Home page
 Arachne HTML support at freedos.org
 Arachne web browser. Installing and setting up for internet connection via Ethernet network adapter

1996 software
Discontinued web browsers
DOS software
Gopher clients
Internet suites
Web browsers for DOS
Free web browsers
Free software programmed in C